Pasqualino is a surname and given name. Notable people with the name include: 

surname
Antonio Pasqualino, 15th-century Patrician of Venice
Fortunato Pasqualino, Italian novelist, philosopher, playwright and journalist
Luke Pasqualino (born 1990), British actor

given name
Pasqualino Abeti (born 1948), Italian sprinter
Pasqualino Borsellino (born 1956), Italian football player and manager
Pasqualino De Santis (1927–1996), Italian cinematographer
Pasqualino Lolordo (1887–1929), was an Italian-born American Mafia boss
Pasqualino Morbidelli (1948–2020), Italian boxer
Pasqualino Moretti (born 1947), Italian cyclist